Sausvatnet is a lake that is located in Brønnøy Municipality in Nordland county, Norway. There is also a small village on the eastern shore called Sausvatn.

See also
 List of lakes in Norway
 Geography of Norway

References

Lakes of Nordland
Brønnøy